Oleksiy Bashakov (born 3 January 1988, in Kremenchuk, Ukraine) and is a Ukrainian football midfielder. He is 175 centimeters tall (6'0") and weighs 61 kilograms (165.3 pounds).

Club history
He has played for FC Kremin Kremenchuk in the Druha Liha B franchise since 2005.
He also played for  "Atlant-Kremez" Kremenchuk club.

External links
Official team website for FC Kremin Kremenchuk
FC Kremin Kremenchuk Squad

Living people
FC Kremin Kremenchuk players
Ukrainian footballers
1988 births
Association football midfielders
People from Kremenchuk
Sportspeople from Poltava Oblast